"Free the People" is a single by the Dubliners which was released in October 1971. Written by Phil Coulter, the single charted in the Irish Top Ten Singles chart at No. 7.

Charts

References

The Dubliners songs
1971 singles
1971 songs
Songs written by Phil Coulter